The Reformation: A History is a 2003 history book by the English historian Diarmaid MacCulloch. It is a survey of the European Reformation between 1490 and 1700. It won the 2003 Wolfson History Prize (UK) and the 2004 National Book Critics Circle Award (US).

Editions
English-language editions:
Reformation: Europe's House Divided (Paperback).  Penguin Books Ltd (2 September 2004). 
Reformation: Europe's House Divided 1490–1700 (Hardcover). Allen Lane (30 September 2004).  (UK edition).
The Reformation: A History (Hardcover).  Viking Adult (3 May 2004).  (US edition)
The Reformation (Hardcover). Viking Books (June 2004).  (UK edition)
The Reformation (Paperback). Penguin (Non-Classics); Reprint edition (25 March 2005).  (US edition)
The Reformation (Paperback). Penguin Books; Reprint edition (May 2005).  (UK edition).

External links
Reviews
The Reformation, in The Atlantic Monthly, May 2004
The Reformation, in Cercles by Detlev Maresin
The Reformation, in Commonweal by Brad S. Gregory, May 21, 2004.
The Reformation, in Christian Century by Hans J. Hillerbrand, February 8, 2005.
The Reformation rumbles on., in HERO by Charlie Peverett, October 2004.
The Varieties of Error, in Crisis Magazine by Edward Short, March 2005
When Europe fought over the nature of God, in Christian Science Monitor by Gregory M. Lamb, May 25, 2004 edition

Excerpt
Who or what is a Catholic?

2003 non-fiction books
21st-century history books
Books by Diarmaid MacCulloch
History books about Christianity
History books about Europe
National Book Critics Circle Award-winning works
Protestant Reformation